Princess Marie-Louise Razafinkeriefo of Madagascar (1 May 1897 – 18 January 1948) was the last heir apparent and pretender to the throne of the Kingdom of Madagascar. She was a grandniece, and the adoptive daughter, of Ranavalona III. During World War II, she worked as a nurse and was made a Dame of the National Order of the Legion of Honour by the French government for her medical service.

Biography 

Princess Marie-Louise of Madagascar was born in exile on 1 May 1897 at the Hotel de l'Europe in Saint-Denis, Réunion. Her mother, Princess Razafinandriamanitra, was a daughter of Princess Rasendranoro and a niece of Ranavalona III. She was an illegitimate child, as her mother had conceived her with an unknown French soldier. She was born while the royal family was in exile in French territory after the Malagasy monarchy was abolished due to French colonial rule. Her mother died five days after giving birth. Although the royal family were Protestant, Marie-Louise was baptized in the Catholic faith at the Cathedral of St. Denis to appease the French. She was later adopted by Queen Ranavalona and was, according to the traditional rules of succession, the heir apparent to the abolished throne of Madagascar.

Within a month of arriving in Saint-Denis, the royal family were moved into a house owned by Madame de Villentroy on the corner of rue de l'Arsenal and rue du Rempart near the French government offices. Along with the queen and princesses, the royal household included two secretaries, a cook, a maid, and servants. They lived in the house for almost two years before they were moved by the French government. With tensions between France and the United Kingdom over conflict in Sudan, French officials became concerned that Madagascar might launch a rebellion against French rule. Queen Ranavalona's presence in Réunion was seen as a possible source of encouragement for Malagasy rebels, so the royal family was relocated. On 1 February 1899, they boarded the steamship Yang-Tse and sailed to Marseilles. They were held in France for several months before being transferred to a villa in Mustapha Superieur in French Algeria. Despite being Catholic, Marie-Louise attended Protestant services at a Reformed Church with her family in central Algiers.

Marie-Louise left Algeria for France to attend secondary school at the Lycée de Jeunes filles de Versailles. During that time, her great-aunt, Queen Ranavalona died in 1917. In France, Marie-Louise met a French agricultural engineer named André Bossard. They married on 24 June 1921. She continued to receive a small pension from the French government, but decided to pursue a career as a nurse. She was awarded Dame of the National Order of the Legion of Honor by the French government for her medical services during World War II. Marie-Louise and Bosshard's marriage was childless, and they later divorced. She lived her remaining years as a socialite in Parisian high society. She died in Bazoches-sur-le-Betz on 18 January 1948 and was buried in Montreuil. She was the last successor to the throne of Madagascar.

Foreign honors
  Dame of the National Order of the Legion of Honour

References

Bibliography 
 
 

1897 births
1948 deaths
Heirs apparent
French nurses
French women nurses
French socialites
French women in World War II
Malagasy exiles
Malagasy expatriates in Algeria
Malagasy emigrants to France
Malagasy people of French descent
Malagasy monarchy
Malagasy royalty
Malagasy Roman Catholics
Recipients of the Legion of Honour
People from Saint-Denis, Réunion
People of Malagasy descent from Réunion
Pretenders
World War II nurses
Women from Réunion
Heirs apparent who never acceded
Female heirs apparent
20th-century French women